Cesar Augusto Sciammarella (born August 22, 1924) is an Argentine civil engineer who made significant contributions to the field of experimental mechanics. In the last decade, he has extended his pioneering developments in moiré, holography, and speckle interferometry methodologies down to the nanometer level. These efforts have enabled optics to be applied beyond the classical Rayleigh limit, reaching the nanometre range, and allowed electron microscopy to reach resolutions on the order of atomic distances.

His research is widely used for 3D reconstruction and stress and strain analysis. In his Doctoral Thesis on the Moiré method, he extended the Continuum Mechanics model originally developed by Dantu to large deformations. He developed fundamental equations on the properties of moiré fringes, signs conventions. He applied the moiré method to the solution of a plasticity problem. This was the first complete analysis of a non elastic problem with the moiré method. Dr Sciammarella generalised the concept of fringe order in methods that measure displacements using Fourier analysis in the process of formation of the fringe images. He proved formally that the orders could be represented by real numbers instead of integers, as was usual at the time of his publication. In 1966, he presented a full model of the moiré fringes as phase modulated signals and provided a method to get displacements and strains for moiré and photo-elastic fringes. He introduced in the literature the Fourier method as a tool for fringe pattern analysis. His model stands today as a standard model used in the fringe analysis method.

Education
 Diploma in Civil Engineering, University of Buenos Aires, July 1950
 Ph.D., Illinois Institute of Technology, June 1960

Cesar Sciammarella received his diploma in Civil Engineering from the University of Buenos Aires in July 1950. After graduation, he worked as a professional engineer in different industries and in different capacities, including the Director of the Materials Testing Laboratories in the Metallurgy and Materials Division of the Atomic Energy Commission of Argentina. Later, he was invited by Dr A.J. Durelli to come to the US to get a PhD degree. He received his Ph.D., from the Illinois Institute of Technology, in June 1960. Upon graduation, he returned to the Argentine Atomic Energy Commission.

Biography, professional life and work
From 1952-57 Cesar was Professor of Physics at Argentine Army Engineering School. This was a period in Argentina under the democratically-elected Juan Domingo Perón. The coup that brought down Perón's difficult republic was aided by officers from Argentine Army Engineering School. Although Cesar was not involved in the coup he was detained and tortured during the uprising. Peron's government fell two weeks after his detention and he was able to escape during the confusion. He spent several months fighting pneumonia caused by his detention.
  
In 1962 he was invited to be Associate professor at the University of Florida, Gainesville. This is where he did some of his pioneering work on using the Moiré method and the Fourier method to analyse the contours and deformations of bodies. In 1967 he became professor at the Department of Aerospace and Applied Mechanics, Polytechnic Institute of Brooklyn. It was during this period that Sciammarella pioneered digital analysis of moiré fringes with the use of computers. In 1985, he further developed this methodology by putting together an optics and computer system for fringe pattern analysis. Later he published a series papers answering the fundamental question of how far is it possible to recover fringe order information utilising computer analysis. This work culminated in the paper Heisenberg Principle Applied to the Analysis of Speckle Interferometry Fringes. 

Since 2005 Dr. Sciammarella has worked in cutting edge optical technology going beyond the Rayleigh limit that has traditionally been considered to be the maximum resolution that can be obtained in optics in far field observations. With the support of his co-workers he has succeeded in overcoming the Rayleigh limit. In recent work measurements in the far field have been carried out in nano crystals and nano spheres with accuracies on the order of ±3.3 nm.

In 2012 Cesar Sciammarella and his son Dr. Federico Sciammarella co-authored Experimental Mechanics of Solids, a comprehensive textbook of the techniques used in experimental mechanics.

Professional positions

Research, teaching positions
 1972 - 2008 Professor, Illinois Institute of Technology, Department of Mechanical and Aerospace Engineering, Director of the Experimental Stress Analysis Laboratory
 2003 - 2008 Professor, Politechnico di Bari Dipartimento di Ingegneria Meccanica e Gestionale, Bari, Italy.     
 1991 - 1999 Non-Resident Professor, University degli Studi, Nuoro, Italy
 1967 - 1972	Professor, Polytechnic Institute of Brooklyn, Department of Aerospace, Applied Mechanics
 1961 - 1967	Professor, University of Florida, Department of Mechanics
 1956 - 1957	Professor, University of Buenos Aires, School of Engineering, Department of Physics
 1952 - 1957	Professor of Physics, Argentine Army Engineering School

Visiting positions
 Polytechnic Institute of Milano, Milano, Italy, 1972, 1976.
 University of Cagliari, Cagliari, Italy, 1979.
 Polytechnic Institute of Lausanne, Lausanne, Switzerland, 1979.
 University of Poitiers, Poitiers, France, 1980.
 Polytechnic Institute of Bari, Bari, Italy, 1992, 1994, 1998, 2003 to 2008.

Honors and awards
 2013 Honorary Member, In recognition of his eminent  position in Experimental Mechanics, SEM.
 2011 Fylde Electronics Prize, BSSM. Best paper published in the Journal Strain in 2010.
 2011 P.S. Theocaris award in recognition of pioneering efforts in Optical  Methods SEM.
 2001. Elected to deliver the 2001 Murray lecture, Society for Experimental Mechanics.
 2000. Nominated Life Honorary Member of Italian Association of Stress Analysis.
 1999. Prize for the paper entitled “Holographic Interferometry Applied to the Solution of a shell problem” has been selected, by the International Society for Optical Engineering to be included in a volume of the SPIE Milestone Series of Selected Papers in the field of Holography.
 1998. Special award for Services to the Society for Experimental Mechanics.
 1998. Paper entitled “Holographic Moiré, an Optical Tool for the Determination of Displacements, Strains, Contours and Slope of Surfaces”, has been selected, by the International Society for Optical Engineering to be included in a volume of the SPIE Milestone Series of Selected Papers in the field of Holography.
 1997. Nominated Life Fellow of the Society of Mechanical Engineers.
 1991. Lazan Award, for outstanding original contributions in Experimental Mechanics, Society for Experimental Mechanics.
1982. Fellow, Society for Experimental Mechanics.
 1982. Hetenyi Award for the best paper in Experimental Mechanics, Holographic Moiré in Real Time, Society for Experimental Mechanics.
 1980. Frocht Award, which recognizes outstanding educators in the field of experimental mechanics, Society for Experimental Stress Analysis.
 1972. Award for distinguished services to the Applied Mechanics Reviews, American Society of Mechanical Engineers.
 1970. Academy of Mechanics, Special volume 1970, “Moiré Holographic Technique for Three-Dimensional Stress Analysis,” selected as one of the outstanding papers published in the area of mechanics by resident authors in the Americas.
 1966. Sigma Xi Faculty Research Award for Achievements in the Field of Engineering, (Florida Chapter).

References

1924 births
Living people
Argentine civil engineers
Argentine expatriates in the United States
Fellows of the Society for Experimental Mechanics